Yoga Wii is a fitness video game for the Wii home console, developed by Indian studio Trine Games and published by JoWooD Entertainment. Using the Wii Balance Board, and featuring tips and videos from Polish model Anja Rubik, Yoga guides the subject through 30 yoga positions in a variety of virtual Asian settings using an interactive "Yoga Guru". Positions include the lotus position, tāḍāsana, śavāsana, and naṭarājāsana. Yoga was released November 2009.

References

External links
 Yoga for Wii
 Yoga Wii at Internet Movie Database

2009 video games
Fitness games
Video games developed in India
Wii-only games
Wii games
Wii Balance Board games
Multiplayer and single-player video games
JoWooD Entertainment games